This is a list of the Nepal national football team results from 1972 to 1989.

Results

1972

1979

1982

1983

1984

1985

1986

1987

1988

1989

See also
 Nepal national football team (1990–2009)

results
1970s in Nepal
1980s in Nepalese sport